Roland Schär (born 1 July 1950) is a former Swiss cyclist. He competed in the team time trial at the 1972 Summer Olympics.

References

External links
 

1950 births
Living people
Swiss male cyclists
Olympic cyclists of Switzerland
Cyclists at the 1972 Summer Olympics